Álex García (born 14 November 1981) is a Spanish actor. He rose to prominence for his performances in television series Amar en tiempos revueltos and Tierra de lobos.

Biography 
Álex García was born on 14 November 1981 in San Cristóbal de la Laguna, in the island of Tenerife. He worked as a local reporter in the Canary Islands. He moved from the Canary Islands to Madrid to train his acting chops at Cristina Rota's attelier. He appeared in serial drama Compañeros playing Serpa. He featured in minor roles in series such as Hospital Central and Génesis, en la mente del asesino, rising to prominence for his television performances as Alfonso García in Amar en tiempos revueltos and César Bravo in Tierra de lobos. He also earned early public recognition for his role in drama series Sin tetas no hay paraíso.

He landed his first major film role in Six Points About Emma (2011), starring alongside Verónica Echegui.

Awards 
 Goya award for Best New Actor (2016) [Nominated]

Notes

References

External links 

Living people
1981 births
Spanish male film actors
Spanish male television actors
Male actors from the Canary Islands
People from San Cristóbal de La Laguna
21st-century Spanish male actors